Naser-e Do Shahid Chamran (also Romanized as Nas̱er-e Do Shahīd Chamrān) is a village in Arzuiyeh Rural District, in the Central District of Arzuiyeh County, Kerman Province, Iran. At the 2006 census, its population was 53, in 14 families.

References 

Populated places in Arzuiyeh County